The Pinkston–Mays Store Building is a historic commercial building at 107-109 Lackston Street in Lowell, Arkansas.  It is a two-story brick building with a flat roof, and is divided into two storefronts, separated by a stairway leading to the second floor.  The two storefronts are arranged identically, with a central entrance flanked by fixed glass windows.  The elements of the first floor facade are separated by brick pilaster, and the storefronts are highlighted by brick corbelling above.  Built in 1902, the building is a little-altered local example of early 20th century commercial architecture.

The building was listed on the National Register of Historic Places in 1988.

See also
National Register of Historic Places listings in Benton County, Arkansas

References

Commercial buildings on the National Register of Historic Places in Arkansas
Commercial buildings completed in 1902
National Register of Historic Places in Benton County, Arkansas
1902 establishments in Arkansas